Raymond-Serge Balé is a Congolese diplomat who has been Congo-Brazzaville's Permanent Representative to the United Nations since 2008.

Balé was a teacher before he began working at the Ministry of Foreign Affairs. He was Secretary-General of the Ministry of Foreign Affairs from 2003 to 2005. Subsequently he was posted in Addis Ababa as Ambassador to Ethiopia and the African Union from 2005 to 2008. After Basile Ikouébé was appointed as Minister of Foreign Affairs in 2007, Balé was appointed to replace him as Permanent Representative to the United Nations.

References

Living people
Republic of the Congo diplomats
Permanent Representatives of the Republic of the Congo to the United Nations
Ambassadors of the Republic of the Congo to Ethiopia
Year of birth missing (living people)